Pappanikunnel Thankappan Saju (born 14 October 1973), better known by his stage name Saju Navodaya, is an Indian actor and comedian who works in Malayalam films, television and stage. He began his career as a comedian on stage shows and later forayed into television and into films. In January 2020, he contested in the second season of Malayalam reality TV show Bigg Boss.

Personal life
Saju Navodaya was born sixth among nine children to Pappanikunnel Thankappan and Manka at Udayamperoor, Kochi in Kerala, India. He did his schooling at SNDP HSS, Udayamperoor. He was a regular participant in almost all the competitions in school youth festivals. Saju has directed many dramas which won prizes in Ernakulam district level youth festivals in late 1990s. He studied at Sree Rama Varma Government Sanskrit College, Thrippunithura before starting a dance institute in Udayamperoor to teach classical and cinematic dance. He is also an ardent follower of sports and enjoys playing Cricket and Association football. He has organized and managed sports teams, sports clubs and sports events, such as cricket and football tournaments. Saju Navodaya is married to Resmi, a trained classical dancer.

Career
Saju began his career as an amateur mimicry artist performing in stage shows for some local clubs and festivals in his hometown. A professional mimicry artist Manoj Guinness gave him an opportunity in his professional mimicry troupe in Kochi named Cochin Navodaya. Later on, Saju's name was changed to Saju Navodaya after associating with the troupe. He was known for imitating actors that made him a regular performer during stage shows presented by his troupe in India and abroad.

As of 2020, Saju is the Captain of the Mimicry Artists Association Fighter (MAA Fighters), a team in the Celebrity Cricket Fraternity (CCF), a Cricket league that includes film actors, directors, assistant directors, musicians, producers, choreographers, television actors, mimicry artistes, and media professionals. In January 2020, he entered as a contestant in the second season  of the 15 week-long Malayalam reality television show Bigg Boss (Malayalam season 2), broadcast on Asianet and hosted by actor Mohanlal. He was elected as the Captain of the Bigg Boss house four times, in week 2, 6, 7, and 8.

Filmography

Films

Television
Bhima Jewels Comedy Festival
Comedy Stars season 1
Comedy Super Nights 2
Cinemaa Chirima
Pashanam Shaji Speaking
Kaliyil Alpam Kaaryam
Tamaar Pataar
Comedy Stars Plus
Onam Upperi
Nalla Best Family
 Bigg Boss (Malayalam season 2)
Priyapetta Nattukare
Comedy stars season 2
Star Singer season 8
Boeing Boeing (Web Series)
Sura Chettai  (Web Series)
 Funs Upon a time

Playback singer

Awards

References

External links
 

Living people
Male actors from Kochi
Male actors in Malayalam cinema
Indian male film actors
Malayalam comedians
Indian male comedians
21st-century Indian male actors
Malayalam playback singers
Indian male playback singers
Singers from Kochi
1977 births
Bigg Boss Malayalam contestants